Pogost is a rural locality (a village) in Kupriyanovskoye Rural Settlement, Gorokhovetsky District, Vladimir Oblast, Russia. As of 2010, the population was 5.

Geography 
The village is located 10 km south-west from Vyezd, 14 km south-west from Gorokhovets.

References 

Rural localities in Gorokhovetsky District